Michigan's 14th congressional district was a congressional district that stretched from eastern Detroit westward to Farmington Hills, then north to the suburb of Pontiac. From 1993 to 2013, it was based entirely in Wayne County.

It was last represented by Brenda Lawrence.

According to Michigan's law on redistricting, the highest numbered district must be in the southeast corner of the state. However, despite being the highest numbered district, the 14th district was not in the southeast corner of the state; the 7th district was.

After the 2020 U.S. census, Michigan's 14th district was removed in the 2020 United States redistricting cycle.

Future 
The district became obsolete, after the 2022 United States House of Representatives elections, as Michigan lost one district, due to reappointment after the 2020 United States census.

Recent election results in statewide races

History 
In the 1960s, the 14th congressional district consisted of Hamtramck, the northeast portion of Detroit, Harper Woods and the Grosse Pointes.  The 1964 redistricting that created these boundaries placed Lucien Nedzi, who had represented the old 14th district, in the same congressional district as fellow Democratic incumbent Harold Ryan.  Nedzi was the more liberal of the two Democrats, and won the primary.  In the 1972 redistricting, East Detroit and Warren south of 10 Mile Road were added to the district while some of the district in Detroit was moved to other districts.  Prior to the 1972 redistricting, the majority of voters in the district were residents of Detroit.  The 1972 redistricting changed the district from having a population based on the 1970 census that was 10% African American to one that was 3% African American, what with 70,000 or more residents added from East Detroit and Warren, with the latter city as a place where black families could in 1970 literally be counted with one's fingers. 

At the same time, the percentage of people who were either immigrants or had at least one parent who was an immigrant fell from 46% to 37%.  This was more a reflection of the fact that the residents of Warren and East Detroit at the time were in many cases literally the children and grandchildren of the residents of north-east Detroit and Hamtramck.  Those born in Poland or with at least one parent born there fell from 12% to 9% of the population, the same group for Canadians fell from 7% to 6% the Italian group held steady at 6% while the German group actually rose from 4% to 6%.  Since all these figures are based on the 1970 census, the changes reflect differences between the areas added and dropped, not any population movement.
Based on the 1970 census, the district had the most people who identified having Belgian ancestry of any congressional district in the country, and one of the most heavily Polish as well.  Based on the 1970 census, it was possible to write that Hamtramck was "an almost entirely Polish-American city".

From 1982 until the 1992 redistricting, the 14th congressional district included the northeast Detroit (basically north of 6 mile and east of Ryan), Grosse Pointe Farms, Grosse Point Woods, Grosse Pointe Shores, Hamtramck, Harper Woods, the southern third of St. Clair Shores, Eastpointe, Center Line, Warren south of 10 mile and west of Van Dyke, all of Sterling Heights, Utica, Hazel Park, Madison Heights, and Troy south of about Big Beaver Road, and west of Rochester Road.  The district was represented by Dennis Hertel.

Conyers' 1st district included Highland Park, and Detroit between the Southfield Freeway and a line running from the south end of Highland Park over to the boundary with Dearborn.  The eastern boundary of the district was with the 14th district and the northern boundary was 8 mile road.

All of the Wayne County portion of the 14th was retained in the 14th in the 1992 redistricting. It also retained most of the district area in Detroit from Conyers' old 1st district and all of Highland Park.  In addition, it took in the far north-western part of Detroit and Redford Township from the 17th district, which prior to redistricting was represented by Sander Levin, and after 1992 did not exist (since there were only 16 districts).  The south end of St. Clair Shores and about 80% of Eastpointe were put in the district that ended up being David Bonior's district, while the rest of Eastpointe, as well as the remaining areas in Warren, Center Line, Maidson Heights, Hazel Park, Sterling Heights, Utica and Troy were merged into the district that ended up represented by the 17th district's representative Sander Levin, renumbered as the 12th post-redistricting.

Demographic history 
The change over time in the congressional district can be seen by what has happened in the one place that has remained constantly in the district since the 1960s, Hamtramck.  Hamtramck is no longer a mainly Polish city.  20% of the population is East Indian or Bangladeshi, 19% is black or African American, and almost five percent reports multiple races.  Of the 53% that is "white" according to the broad definition used by the Census, Albanians are the most numerous sub-group, with large numbers of Yemenis and Bosnians as well.  It is possible that close to half the population is Muslim.

The percentage of African Americans in the 2010 boundaries of the district had fallen from 61% to 59% between censuses, largely as a result of growth in the Arab population in Dearborn, combined with migration into Macomb and Oakland counties, as well as migration to Macomb, Oakland and suburban Wayne County, as well as out of Michigan entirely, from the Detroit and Highland Park portions of the district.  Even the white population (including the large Arab populations in Hamtramck and Dearborn among others that rarely self-identify as white and clearly see themselves as distinct ethnic groups) within the district boundaries had declines by just over 23,000.  At the same time those groups that were grouped under the heading "Asia" by the census saw their population in the district boundaries rise by a net of 2,000 during the 2010s, largely fueled by the growth of the Bangladeshi population in Hamtramck.

2012 election 
After the 2010 census, the 14th was reconfigured to take in much of eastern Detroit and the Grosse Pointes. It was also pushed westward into Oakland County to include Southfield, Farmington Hills and Pontiac. For all intents and purposes, this was the successor to the old 13th district. Meanwhile, most of the old 14th became the new 13th.

The 13th's freshman congressman, Hansen Clarke, had his home drawn into the new 13th, but opted to follow most of his constituents into the new 14th. In the Democratic primary for this hybrid urban-suburban district, Clarke faced fellow congressman Gary Peters, whose 9th district had been eliminated in redistricting, as well as Southfield mayor Brenda Lawrence and two other Democrats.  Preliminary reports showed Peters, who had previously represented part of the Oakland County portion of the district, winning with 47% of the vote to Clarke's 35% and Lawrence's 13%.

List of members representing the district

Recent election results

2012

2014

2016

2018

2020

Historical district boundaries

See also

Michigan's congressional districts
List of United States congressional districts

Notes

District boundaries were redrawn in 1993, and 2003 due to reapportionment following the censuses of 1990 and 2000.

References
U.S. Representatives 1837-2003, Michigan Manual 2003-2004

 Congressional Biographical Directory of the United States 1774–present

14
Constituencies established in 1933
1933 establishments in Michigan
Constituencies disestablished in 2023
2023 disestablishments in Michigan